Gazpacho is a cold soup from Andalusia, Spain.

Gazpacho may also refer to:

Food
Torta de gazpacho, a type of flat bread used to prepare a gazpacho-style dish
Gazpacho (mixture), a cold Puerto Rican avocado, onion and fish-based mixture

Music and TV
Gazpacho (band), a progressive rock band from Norway
Gazpacho (song), a song by Marillion from their 1995 album Afraid of Sunlight
Gazpacho, the name of a character in the TV cartoon show Chowder
Gazpacho, a character in the Spanish TV show Los Fruitis

Other
Gazpacho (software), a GUI builder for the GTK+ toolkit written in Python